A constitutional referendum was held in Niger on 18 July 1999. The new constitution would restore multi-party democracy after the military coup earlier in the year had ousted (and resulted in the death of) elected President Ibrahim Baré Maïnassara.

The third constitutional referendum of the 1990s, it was approved by 90% of voters with a turnout of only around 31%. General elections for the presidency and National Assembly were held in October and November.

Results

References

Niger
Constitutional
Referendums in Niger
Constitutional referendums in Niger